This article is a list of songs written by Irving Berlin. It is arranged in alphabetical order, but can be rearranged in chronological order by clicking at the top of that column.  You may also click twice at the top of the "click to play" column, to bring those items to the top of the list.  Furthermore, you can click on the last column to bring to the top those songs that have Wikipedia articles about them.

Sources vary as to the number of songs actually written by Berlin, but a 2001 article in TIME put the figure at around 1,250. Of these, 25 tunes reached #1 on the pop charts.  This is not a complete list, given that he wrote hundreds more songs than the ones listed here.

This list gives the year each song was written, or alternatively groups each song into a five-year period. The list is incomplete but gives a sense of Berlin's evolution as a songwriter over a period of decades.

According to the New York Public Library, whose Irving Berlin collection comprises 550 non-commercial recordings radio broadcasts, live performances, and private recordings, he published his first song, "Marie from Sunny Italy", in 1907 and had his first major international hit, "Alexander's Ragtime Band" in 1911.

Many of Berlin's songs were included in the seventeen complete scores he wrote for Broadway musicals and revues, including The Cocoanuts, As Thousands Cheer, Louisiana Purchase, Miss Liberty, Mr. President, Call Me Madam and Annie Get Your Gun.

List

References

External links 

 
Lists of songs by songwriters